The Men's 3000 metres event  at the 2004 IAAF World Indoor Championships was held on March 5–6.

Medalists

Results

Heat
First 4 of each heat (Q) and next 4 fastest (q) qualified for the semifinals.

Final

References
Results

3000
3000 metres at the World Athletics Indoor Championships